The 2015–16 Central Arkansas Bears basketball team represented the University of Central Arkansas during the 2015–16 NCAA Division I men's basketball season. The Bears were led by head coach Russ Pennell and played their home games at the Farris Center. They were members of the Southland Conference. They finished the season 7–21, 6–12 in Southland play to finish in a three-way tie for ninth place. Due to APR penalties, they were not eligible for postseason play, including the Southland tournament.

Preseason 
The Bears were picked to finish 12th in both the Southland Conference Coaches' Poll and the Sports Information Director's Poll.

Roster

Schedule and results
Source:

|-
!colspan=9 style="" | Exhibition

|-
!colspan=9 style="" | Non-Conference Regular Season

|-
!colspan=9 style="" | Conference Games

See also
2015–16 Central Arkansas Sugar Bears basketball team

References

Central Arkansas Bears basketball seasons
Central Arkansas
Central Arkansas Bears basketball
Central Arkansas Bears basketball